Connor De Phillippi (born December 25, 1992) is an American professional racing driver and gold rated BMW Motorsport works driver.

Racing career

Early career
De Phillippi began karting at the age of 5 years old and by the time he was 14 years old, he had won 21 national titles, including the only person to ever win 4 SKUSA SuperNational titles. In 2007, at the age of 14, De Phillippi was selected as a member of Team USA to participate in the prestigious Brazilian Granja Viana 500 mile kart race. With a field of 70 karts and star racers like Rubens Barrichello, Felipe Massa, Tony Kanaan, Nelson Piquet Jr. and a host of other Formula 1, Champ Car and Indy Racing League (now the IndyCar Series) drivers, De Phillippi worked Team USA up into 2nd place. After handing the kart off to a teammate, a late night incident with lapped traffic ended Team USA’s chance at the podium.

2008-2009 Skip Barber
In 2008, he made the move from karting to open wheel racing, winning the Skip Barber West Coast Series championship and Rookie of the Year honors. De Phillippi also participated in the Skip Barber National Series Racing Shoot-out, beating out 50 other competitors and earning him a full ride in the Skip Barber National Championship for 2008, as part of the MAZDASPEED driver development ladder. Connor finished sixth in his first national open wheel series and was awarded the Rising Star Award by eFormulaCarNews.com and their readers.

Skip Barber National Championship & Team USA Scholarship Winner
In 2009, he won the Skip Barber National Championship, winning a record 7 of the 14 races. By winning the Skip Barber National Championship, De Phillippi won a full-ride for the 2010 Star Mazda Championship as part of the Mazda Road to Indy Program. He also participated in the Formula Ford Festival at Silverstone Circuit after winning the Team USA Scholarship, where he became the youngest and only second American to ever win the Walter Hayes Trophy. De Phillippi also won the 2009 Silver State Championship in the U.S. Legends Series.

Star Mazda Championship Series

In 2010, De Phillippi moved up to the Star Mazda Championship for JDC MotorSports, finishing third in points, capturing his first victory in the final race of the season at Road America, and Rookie of the Year honors.

In 2011, De Phillippi returned to the Star Mazda Championship, driving this time for former IndyCar Series owner Dale Pelfrey and his revitalized Team Pelfrey. He started off the 2011 season opener just as he finished the 2010 season, with a win at the Honda Grand Prix of St. Petersburg.  He also won the Night Before the 500 at Lucas Oil Raceway at Indianapolis, setting the track record (19.999 seconds), starting from pole, and leading all 85 laps. De Phillippi went on to win 2 more races at Circuit Trois-Rivières and Mazda Raceway Laguna Seca. He was the runner up in the championship to Tristan Vautier, capturing a season-leading 4 wins, while helping Team Pelfrey win the series team championship.

While De Phillippi had plans of moving up to the Indy Lights series, a last-second deal fell through. He was able to secure a seat for the 2012 Star Mazda season, this time driving for Ricardo Juncos and Juncos Racing, who won the 2010 Star Mazda Championship with Conor Daly. Just as the 2011 season began, De Phillippi took victory during at St. Petersburg.  During round 5, De Phillippi again dominated the Night Before the 500, taking pole position, leading every lap, and recording the fastest lap of the race. He finished the season fourth in points, losing a tie-breaker for third with Sage Karam by winning two races compared to Karam's three.

Porsche Junior Factory Driver
On November 27, 2012, it was announced that De Phillippi had won a spot as a Porsche Junioren factory driver and will compete as a fully funded factory driver in the Porsche Carrera Cup Germany in 2013.

De Phillippi is only the second American to receive Porsche AG funding. The first was Patrick Long, who is currently one of 15 Porsche Works drivers.

2013
As a new member of the Porsche Motorsport family for the 2013 season, De Phillippi joined the experienced FÖRCH Racing by Lukas Motorsport team, based in Poland and completed a full season in the Porsche Carrera Cup Germany.

Despite this being De Phillippi's first year racing a closed cockpit car and racing circuits he had never raced on, he managed to adapt very quickly. In a field of drivers with vast experience on these circuits and in the Porsche 911 GT3 Cup car, De Phillippi showed immediate pace and excellent consistency. Up until the final round of the season at the legendary Hockenheimring, De Phillippi was the only driver in the field to finish every single race. Despite a last round DNF, the consistency paid off and De Phillippi was crowned the 2013 Porsche Carrera Cup Germany Rookie of the Year.

In addition to competing in the Porsche Carrera Cup Germany Championship, De Phillippi also teamed up with Manthey Racing for two rounds of the Veranstaltergemeinschaft Langstreckenpokal Nürburgring, which is more widely known as the VLN Endurance Racing Championship Nürburgring. All VLN races are 4 or 6 hour endurance races and are held at the famous Nürburgring Nordschleife, widely considered the most technically challenging race track on the planet.

2014
2014 began with a month of firsts for De Phillippi. He joined up with Swiss squad FACH Auto Tech in one of their Porsche 997 GT3R's, along with a trio of experienced racers in Sebastian Asch, Martin Ragginger and Otto Klohs for the 9th running of the Dubai 24 Hour endurance race. It took place at the Dubai Autodrome in Dubai, United Arab Emirates. After the half way point of the race, De Phillippi had the team in what looked to be podium contention, however they were struck by bad luck after a mechanical failure. After a lengthy repair, they were back on track and ended up finishing 10th in class.

Just a couple weeks after the Dubai 24 Hour race, De Phillippi took part in the 52nd running of the Rolex 24 at Daytona, his first 24 at Daytona race. This was the first event of the inaugural Tudor United SportsCar Championship, the result of a merger between the American Le Mans Series and Rolex Sports Car Series. He teamed up with co-drivers Patrick Lindsey, Kevin Estre (the 2013 Porsche Carrera Cup Germany Champion), Jason Hart and Mike Vess in the #73 Park Place Motorsports Porsche GT3 America. The team ended up finishing the race 13th in class, while completing 645 laps.

2021
During the 2021 Mobil 1 Sebring 12 Hours, De Phillippi wrecked the class-leading Corvette Racing C8.R with less than 10 minutes to go. IMSA decided that he had initiated avoidable contact that warranted a drive-through penalty.

Star Mazda Championship

Complete IMSA SportsCar Championship results
(key) (Races in bold indicate pole position; results in italics indicate fastest lap)

References

External links

 
 
 

1992 births
Living people
Sportspeople from Orange County, California
Racing drivers from California
Formula Ford drivers
Indy Pro 2000 Championship drivers
24 Hours of Daytona drivers
WeatherTech SportsCar Championship drivers
Porsche Supercup drivers
ADAC GT Masters drivers
24H Series drivers
BMW M drivers
Nürburgring 24 Hours drivers
JDC Motorsports drivers
Rahal Letterman Lanigan Racing drivers
Team Pelfrey drivers
Juncos Hollinger Racing drivers
Rowe Racing drivers
Porsche Motorsports drivers
Audi Sport drivers
W Racing Team drivers
Walter Lechner Racing drivers
Phoenix Racing drivers
Le Mans Cup drivers
Porsche Carrera Cup Germany drivers